Roberto Badio Louima (born 4 March 1997) is a Haitian footballer who plays as a forward for Haitian club Violette and the Haiti national team.

Early life
Louima was born in Haiti and named after the Italian footballer Roberto Baggio. He has a younger brother and sister who both play football. Louima is a youth product of the Lionceaux FC having joined at the age of 7, before joining Violette in 2016.

Career
Louima began his career with Violette for a year, before transferring to Real Hope in 2016 where he helped them win Ligue Haïtienne. He returned to Violette in 2017, helping them get promoted from the first division back to the Ligue Haïtienne.

International career
Louima debuted with the Haiti national team in a 1–0 2018 FIFA World Cup qualification loss to Costa Rica on 2 September 2016.

References

External links
 
 

1997 births
Living people
Sportspeople from Port-au-Prince
Haitian footballers
Haiti international footballers
Haiti youth international footballers
Association football forwards
US Avranches players
Ligue Haïtienne players
2021 CONCACAF Gold Cup players
Haiti under-20 international footballers